Ictidosuchidae is an extinct family of therocephalian therapsids.

References 

 
Baurioids
Animals described in 1903